Borislav Karamatev (Bulgarian Cyrillic: Борислав Караматев; born 6 February 1984) is a Bulgarian former footballer who played as a midfielder. He is currently the assistant manager of Botev Plovdiv II.

Career
He started his career in his home town Asenovgrad, playing for local team FC Asenovec. At 19 years old, he moved to CSKA Sofia. Between 2005 and 2008 he played for Botev Plovdiv. He returned to Botev in 2010 when the club was revived, but failed to play an official match and left after a scandal with coach Marin Bakalov, demanding a first team place.

Coaching career
During his stay as a player in FC Asenovets Asenovgrad from 2010 to 2014 he was also coaching at the clubs academy, and from 2014 to 2016 in charge of the clubs first team. In the summer of 2018, he was appointed as the head coach of Maritsa Plovdiv and remained until June 19, 2020, when he started working as a coach at the Botev Plovdiv school.

In June 2018, Karamatev was appointed as manager of Maritsa Plovdiv. He left the position in June 2020, and was then immediately appointed youth coach at his former club, Botev Plovdiv. In the beginning of January 2023, Karamatev was promoted to assistant manager of the clubs reserve team, Botev Plovdiv II.

References

1984 births
Living people
People from Asenovgrad
Bulgarian footballers
Bulgaria under-21 international footballers
Association football midfielders
PFC CSKA Sofia players
Botev Plovdiv players
OFC Sliven 2000 players
FC Lyubimets players
FC Maritsa Plovdiv players
First Professional Football League (Bulgaria) players
Second Professional Football League (Bulgaria) players
Bulgarian football managers